Hognose snake is a common name for several unrelated species of snake with upturned snouts, classified in 2 colubrid snake genera and 1 pseudoxyrhophiid snake genus.  

They include the following genera: 
Heterodon, which occur mainly in the United States and northern Mexico
Leioheterodon, the hognose snakes native to Madagascar
Lystrophis, the South American hognose snakes.

The North American Heterodon species are known for their habit of thanatosis: playing dead when threatened.

Species 
Genus Heterodon:
Mexican hognose snake, Heterodon kennerlyi (Kennicott, 1860)
Gloyd's hognose snake, Heterodon nasicus gloydi (Edgren, 1952)
Western hognose snake, Heterodon nasicus (Baird & Girard, 1852)
Eastern hognose snake, Heterodon platirhinos (Latreille, 1801)
Southern hognose snake, Heterodon simus (Linnaeus, 1766)

Genus Leioheterodon:
Speckled hognose snake, Leioheterodon geayi (Mocquard, 1905)
Malagasy giant hognose snake, Leioheterodon madagascariensis (Duméril & Bibron, 1854)
Blonde hognose snake, Leioheterodon modestus (Günther, 1863)

Genus Lystrophis:
South American hognose snake, Lystrophis dorbignyi (Duméril, Bibron & Duméril, 1854)
Jan's hognose snake, Lystrophis histricus (Jan, 1863)
Lystrophis matogrossensis (Scrocchi & Cruz, 1993)
Lystrophis nattereri (Steindachner, 1867)
Tricolor hognose snake, Lystrophis pulcher (Jan, 1863)
Ringed hognose snake, Lystrophis semicinctus (Duméril, Bibron & Duméril, 1854)

Description 
The hognose snakes' most distinguishing characteristic is their upturned snout/Rostral scale, which aids in digging in sandy soils by using a sweeping, side to side motion. They also like to burrow in masses of humus. Lieoheterodon species are known to dig up the eggs of lizards.

Hognose snakes are extremely variable in color and pattern. Heterodon nasicus and H. kennerlyi tend to be sandy colored with black and white markings, while H. platirhinos varies from reds, greens, oranges, browns, to melanistic (i.e. black) depending on locality. They are sometimes blotched and sometimes solid-colored. Leiohetereodon geayi is a brown or tan colored snake with dark speckling on it.
There are also many different morphs when bred in captivity.

Behavior 

When threatened, hognose snakes will hiss, flatten their necks and raise their heads off the ground like cobras. They sometimes feign strikes, but actual Heterodon bites are very rare. This behaviour has earned them local common names such as "puff adder", "blowing adder", "flathead", "spreadhead", "spreading adder" or "hissing adder". Note: For Heterodon, "puff adder" is a common name inconsistent with established usage. "Puff adder" is the accepted common name of Bitis arietans, an unrelated, dangerously venomous African species of viper, which incidentally does not flatten its neck in any threat display.

If this threat display fails to deter a would-be predator, Heterodon species often roll onto their backs and play dead, going so far as to emit a foul musk and fecal matter from their cloaca (in liquid form) and let their tongues hang out of their mouth, sometimes accompanied by small droplets of blood. If they are rolled upright while in this state, they will often roll back as if insisting they really are dead.  It has been observed that the snake, while appearing to be dead, will still watch the threat that caused the death pose. The snake will 'resurrect' sooner if the threat is looking away from it than if the threat is looking at the snake.

They are rather timid snakes and commonly hide from predators by burrowing down into leaves, sand, etc.

Diet 
Heterodon are diurnal active foragers that typically consume their prey live without any constriction or body pinning, primarily relying on only their jaws to subdue their prey.

For most hognose snake species, the bulk of their diet is made up of rodents and lizards. Heterodon platirhinos is an exception, and specializes in feeding on toads, although other food items such as eggs and insects can make up as much as 50% of its diet.

In captivity 
Hognose snakes are frequently found in herpetoculture. Heterodon nasicus is often considered to be the easiest to care for, and captive-bred stock is easily found. Heterodon platirhinos is also commonly found, but their dietary requirements can be a challenge for some keepers, and there is anecdotal evidence to suggest that feeding them a diet of exclusively rodents contributes to liver problems and a shortened life span. Leioheterodon species are imported regularly from Madagascar, but they are not often bred in captivity and get much larger, so they can pose a set of different challenges for care. Lystrophis species are fairly new to the commercial reptile trade, and are now commonly bred in captivity, but can be some of the more expensive hognose snakes available. Some states, such as the state of Colorado, have strict laws on keeping the western hognose snake. It is considered a native species to Colorado, so it is protected by law. The law states that an individual can keep no more than four native snakes, and forbids the shipping, selling, and breeding of them in the state of Colorado.

Toxicity 
Hognose snakes have mildly toxic venomous saliva and are frequently mistaken for the slightly more dangerous rear fanged snakes which possess grooved teeth and saliva intended for dispatching prey.  Hognose saliva fails to meet the definition of a venom because they have no injection system and do not have behaviours typically seen in venomous animals.  Indeed, the teeth of the hognose are smooth and strong without grooves and the mildly toxic duvernoy's secretions are produced by the Duvernoy's gland, well away from the unique evisceration fangs for which the genus is named. Hognose have never been formally documented using their saliva to kill prey, rather they kill by sawing and impaling prey, biting prey from the side rather than at the head to facilitate this process.  Although it is possible that some day one or more species may provide data that alter the current classification of mildly toxic saliva to actual venom, the absence of any injection mechanism and indeed adaptations counter to venom injection will most likely always leave them difficult to classify.  Hognose are perhaps best described as a transitional species with toxic saliva that is only produced during feeding, failing to fall into either of the classic recognisable categories of venomous or non venomous. Although their saliva is not likely to cause serious injury to humans in small amounts, should the toxic feeding saliva make its way into a cut in large enough amounts over an extended period of time the resulting swelling and localized tissue damage can be problematic in at least one species, H. Nasicus.  Such occurrences are rare however as they are uninclined to bite, instead striking with mouth closed or playing dead.  For these reasons they have been popular pets for more than 100 years despite the irritation experienced should they mistake their keeper's hand for food.

References

External links 
thehognosesnake.co.uk Hognose snakes are really important.
Hognose.com
The European Molecular Biology Laboratory Reptile Database
 *Western hognose snake Species account from the Iowa Reptile and Amphibian Field Guide
 *Eastern hognose snake Species account from the Iowa Reptile and Amphibian Field Guide
 World of Hognose Website for color mutations with pictures, breeders, and advice for the care of hognose snakes

Colubrids
Articles containing video clips
Snake common names
Snakes